Fosenlinjen AS is a ferry company that operates four routes in Fosen, Norway with the two car ferries MF Nidaros I and MF Nidaros II. The company took over the ferries between Garten, Storfosna, Leksa and Værnes in 2000 from Fosen Trafikklag.

References

External links
 

Ferry companies of Trøndelag
Companies established in 2000